The 2021 AFL Women's All-Australian team represents the best-performed players of the 2021 AFL Women's season. The team was announced on 20 April 2021 as a complete women's Australian rules football team of 21 players. The team is honorary and does not play any games.

Selection panel
The selection panel for the 2021 AFL Women's All-Australian team consisted of chairwoman Nicole Livingstone, Steve Hocking, Josh Vanderloo, Kelli Underwood, Sarah Black, Tim Harrington, Shelley Ware, Sharelle McMahon, Courtney Cramey and Melissa Hickey.

Initial squad
The initial 40-woman All-Australian squad was announced on 31 March.  had the most players selected in the initial squad with six, and every team had at least one representative. Fifteen players from the 2020 team were among those selected.

Final team
The final team was announced on 20 April. Collingwood had the most selections with four, and every team except  and  had at least one representative. Six players achieved selection for the first time, while seven players from the 2020 team were selected, two of whom –  vice-captain Karen Paxman and  captain Emma Kearney – achieved selection for the fifth consecutive year. Collingwood co-captain Brianna Davey was announced as the All-Australian captain and  midfielder Kiara Bowers was announced as the vice-captain.

Note: the position of coach in the AFL Women's All-Australian team is traditionally awarded to the coach of the premiership-winning team.

References

External links
 AFLW Awards

2021 AFL Women's season